The 80th Regiment of Foot (Royal Edinburgh Volunteers) was a regiment in the British Army from 1778 to 1783. 

It was formed in Edinburgh, Scotland by letter of service in 1778 for service in North America and sailed to New York commanded by lieutenant-colonel Thomas Dundas in 1779. The regiment then moved to Virginia, where they were captured at the Battle of Yorktown. 

The regiment returned to Scotland to be disbanded in 1783.

Colonels
Colonels of the regiment were:
 1777-1782: Lt. Col Thomas Dundas of Fingask
1777–1783: Lt-Gen. Sir William Erskine of Torrie, Bt. 
1783–1784: Gen. John Leland

References

Infantry regiments of the British Army
Military units and formations established in 1778
Military units and formations disestablished in 1783
1778 establishments in Scotland